Hopewell (on Hammer Creek in Lancaster County, Pennsylvania) is where Peter Grubb, who founded Cornwall, Pennsylvania in 1737, first began his iron making activities about 1739. It is an area about six miles southeast of Cornwall, in Lancaster County. Grubb built two forges on Hammer Creek, called the Upper and Lower Hopewell Forges, to complement his Cornwall Iron Furnace that began operation in 1742. His mansion still stands nearby.

Hopewell became an integral part of the Grubb family's ironworks, founded by Peter Grubb and owned and operated after 1765 by his sons Curtis and Peter.  Peter Jr. lived in the mansion and ran the Hopewell Forges while Curtis lived at Cornwall and operated the Cornwall Iron Furnace. Robert Coleman acquired most of the Grubb properties beginning in 1783, including the Hopewell Forges in 1802. While it is unclear when Hopewell ceased operations, it produced 250 tons in 1833. It probably closed before 1854 when Coleman's Speedwell Forge, also on Hammer Creek, was shut down.

There is little left of the forges today except a few remnants of the dams at the creek. But Peter Grubb's  can still be seen on present-day Route 322. 

Hopewell on Hammer Creek should not be confused with Hopewell Furnace National Historic Site.

References and external links

Buildings and structures in Lancaster County, Pennsylvania
1739 establishments in Pennsylvania